Kami nAPO Muna ULIT is the second tribute album to the 1970s Filipino musical group APO Hiking Society. It was released in 2007, and is a follow-up to the previous year's Kami nAPO Muna. Like the prior album, Kami nAPO Muna Ulit features covers of APO Hiking Society songs, performed by a number of Filipino bands and artists.

Within two weeks of its release, Kami nAPO Muna Ulit was certified as a gold record.

Title and release history
"Kami nAPO Muna ULIT", in Filipino, literally means "it's our turn again", the phrase also being a play on the Apo name. The APO Hiking Society itself used the word nAPO ("na po", a formal phrase meaning "already") in many of their concerts and on a noontime television show.

A two-disc limited edition set of Kami nAPO Muna ULIT has been released; it contains the original Apo Hiking Society renditions of the tribute tracks on the second disc.

Track listing

References

External links
Kami nAPO Muna ULIT Album Review

APO Hiking Society tribute albums
Compilation albums by Filipino artists
2007 compilation albums
Pop rock compilation albums
Universal Records (Philippines) compilation albums